The Women's Javelin Throw event at the 1984 Summer Olympics in Los Angeles, California had an entry list of 29 competitors, with two qualifying groups (29 throwers) before the final (12) took place on Monday August 6, 1984. The top 12 and ties, and all those reaching 60.00 metres advanced to the final. All results were made with a rough surfaced javelin (old design).

Medalists

Abbreviations
All results shown are in metres

Records

Qualification

Group A

Group B

Final

See also
 1982 Women's European Championships Javelin Throw (Athens)
 1983 Women's World Championships Javelin Throw (Helsinki)
 1984 Women's Friendship Games Javelin Throw (Prague)
 1984 Javelin Throw Year Ranking
 1986 Women's European Championships Javelin Throw (Stuttgart)
 1987 Women's World Championships Javelin Throw (Rome)

References

External links
  Official Report
  Results
  todor66

J
Javelin throw at the Olympics
1984 in women's athletics
Women's events at the 1984 Summer Olympics